Schindler's List: Original Motion Picture Soundtrack is the score album for Steven Spielberg's 1993 film of the same name. Composed and conducted by John Williams, the original score features violinist Itzhak Perlman.

The album won the Academy Award for Best Original Score, the BAFTA Award for Best Film Music, and the Grammy Award for Best Score Soundtrack for Visual Media. It also received a Golden Globe Award nomination for Best Original Score.

Theme from Schindler's List is one of the most recognized contemporary film scores, particularly the violin solo. Many high-level figure skaters have used this in their programs, including Katarina Witt, Irina Slutskaya, Anton Schulepov, Yuna Shiraiwa, Paul Wylie, Johnny Weir, Tatiana Navka, Roman Sadovsky, Satoko Miyahara, Nicole Schott, Jason Brown and Yulia Lipnitskaya.

Track listing 
"Theme from Schindler's List" 
"Jewish Town (Krakow Ghetto - Winter '41)"
"Immolation (With Our Lives, We Give Life)" 
"Remembrances" 
"Schindler's Workforce" 
"Oyfn Pripetshik / Nacht Aktion"  (OYF'N Pripetshok performed by The Li-Ron Herzeliya Children's Choir Tel Aviv, conducted by Ronit Shapira)
"I Could Have Done More" 
"Auschwitz-Birkenau"
"Stolen Memories" 
"Making the List" 
"Give Me Your Names" 
"Yeroushalaim Chel Zahav (Jerusalem of Gold)"  (performed by The Ramat Gan Chamber Choir Tel Aviv, conducted by Hana Tzur)
"Remembrances (with Itzhak Perlman)" 
"Theme from Schindler's List (Reprise)"

Not on the soundtrack
The recordings of "OYF'N Pripetshok" and "Yeroushalaim Chel Zahav" heard in the film are very different from the album versions. The recording of "OYF'N Pripetshok" used in the film is from the 1991 film Billy Bathgate. The recording of "Yeroushalaim Chel Zahav" used in the film is from the 1991 film Pour Sacha. Both recordings are contained on the soundtrack albums for those films.

Other tracks that appear in the film, but not in the soundtrack, include:

 the famous tango "Por Una Cabeza" by Carlos Gardel and Alfredo Le Pera is played in the opening nightclub scene
 the tango "Celos (Jealousy)" by Jacob Gade plays next in the nightclub
 the German schlager  ("Im Grunewald ist Holzauktion") by Franz Meißner (music) and Otto Teich (lyrics), performed by the Egon Kaiser Orchestra and sung by Rudolf Scherfling plays after that in the nightclub
 "Mein Vater war ein Wandersmann" is sung live by the patrons at the end of the nightclub scene as they take pictures with Schindler
 the German marching song Erika (Auf der Heide blüht ein kleines Blümelein) by Herms Niel is sung by German troops marching into Krakow
 an instrumental arrangement of the song "Szomorú Vasárnap" by Rezső Seress
 an instrumental arrangement of the song "Deine Augen Sind Dein Herz"
 an instrumental arrangement of the song "In einem kleinen Café in Hernals"
 Polish pop song "Miłość ci wszystko wybaczy" "(Love Forgives All)" by Henryk Wars
 Polish song "To ostatnia niedziela" is played at Schindler's birthday party after he kisses the Jewish girl
 Bach’s English Suite No. 2, played during the liquidation of the ghetto 
 Gute Nacht Mutter, performed by Wilhelm Strienz, plays on loudspeakers as the camp inmates are forced to run naked for inspection.
 Mamatschi (or Mamatschi, kauf mir ein Pferdchen), performed by German Cabaret singer Mimi Thoma, played on loudspeakers in the camp to lure the children out of their hiding places and onto trucks
 "God Bless the Child", performed by Billie Holiday plays as Schindler stays awake at night, deciding to buy the imprisoned Jews from Goeth
 "La Capricieuse, Op. 17" by Edward Elgar, arranged by Jascha Heifetz, performed by Itzhak Perlman and Samuel Sanders, used as score for the scene where Schindler interviews secretaries
In addition, Wojciech Kilar's composition "Exodus" for mixed choir and orchestra was used as score in the trailer in the film.

Certifications

References

External links
 John Williams, Itzhak Perlman - Schindler's List Music on YouTube

1993 soundtrack albums
1990s film soundtrack albums
Drama film soundtracks
Songs about the Holocaust
Grammy Award for Best Score Soundtrack for Visual Media
MCA Records soundtracks
John Williams soundtracks
La-La Land Records soundtracks
Classical music about the Holocaust
Scores that won the Best Original Score Academy Award